Venusian orbit may refer to:
 the orbit of Venus around the Sun
 a cytherocentric orbit, orbit of an object around Venus

See also
 Terrestrial orbit (disambiguation)
 Martian orbit (disambiguation)